Careliopsis clathratula is a species of sea snail, a marine gastropod mollusk in the family Pyramidellidae, the pyrams and their allies. The species is one of three known species within the Careliopsis genus of gastropods, with the exception of the others being Careliopsis modesta and Careliopsis styliformis. The species is one of two species to maintain a binomial authority proposed by Mörch in 1875, the other by Mörch is Careliopsis styliformis.

Distribution
 Marine

References

External links
 To World Register of Marine Species
 Mörch, O. A. L. (1875). Synopsis molluscorum marinorum Indiarum occidentalium imprimis insularum danicarum. Malakozoologische Blätter. 22: 142-184

Pyramidellidae
Gastropods described in 1875